The Palau national football team represents Palau in international football. The team is not affiliated with FIFA or a local confederation. The team play their home games at the PCC Track and Field Stadium in the town of Koror City. Currently, the side is ranked as the worst national team in the world by the Elo rating system.

History
Palau hosted and competed in the Micronesian Games in 1998, in which they finished third. In the tournament, teams were 9-a-side and the matches were 80 minutes in duration and were played on a pitch which was below regulation size. In addition to their first team, Palau also fielded a team consisting of Bangladeshis living on the island. They reached the final in the Micronesian Games in 2014, where the team's trip was partly covered by internet crowd funding.

Competitive record

Micronesian Games

OFC Nations Cup
The Palau national football team was affiliated with OFC between 2007 and 2009. It is currently not a member of OFC.

Results
Palau's score is shown first in each case.

Head-to-head record

Up to matches played on 23 July 2018.

Notable Players

See List of Palau international footballers.

  Charles Reklai Mitchell - played for Cal State Northridge Matadors

Player records

See also
 Soccer in Palau
 Oceania Football Confederation

References

External links
 Palau Football Association

 
Oceanian national association football teams
Oceanian national and official selection-teams not affiliated to FIFA